Michael Broad is a children's author. His latest series is Monsterbook, and Jake Cake and The Werewolf Teacher was shortlisted for the 2007 Waterstones Children's Book Prize.

Selected bibliography

Monsterbook Series
 Pongdollop and the School Stink
 Snotgobble and the Bogey Bully
 Lumpydump and the Terror Teacher
 RumbleFART and the Beastly Bottom

Jake Cake Series
 The Football Beast
 The Pirate Curse
 The Robot Dinner Lady
 The School Dragon
 The Visiting Vampire
 The Werewolf Teacher

Agent Amelia Series
 Ghost Diamond!
 Zombie Cows!
 Hypno Hounds!
 Spooky Ballet!

Picture Books
 Night flight to home
 Broken Bird
 The Little Star Who Wished
 Scaredy Cat and Boo
 Forget-Me-Not
 My Brilliant Book
 A visita do Vampiro

References

External links

Official site

Living people
English children's writers
Year of birth missing (living people)